"Dream Lover" is a song written by Bobby Darin. Darin recorded his composition on March 5, 1959 and released it as a single the following month.  It was produced by Ahmet Ertegun and Jerry Wexler and engineered by Tom Dowd.

Song background
In addition to Darin's vocal, the song features Neil Sedaka on piano.  While recording it Darin decided to stretch out some chord changes he found on the piano and add strings and voices. A picture sleeve, featuring a portrait of Darin, was also issued for this record in the U.S.

Chart performance
It was released as a single on Atco Records in the U.S. in 1959, and became a multi-million seller, reaching No. 2 on the Billboard Hot 100 for a week  and No. 4 on Billboards Hot R&B Sides chart. "Dream Lover" was kept from the No. 1 spot by "The Battle of New Orleans" by Johnny Horton. It did however reach No. 1 on the UK's New Musical Express chart for four weeks during July 1959. The song also reached No. 5 on Norway's VG-lista, No. 5 on Canada's CHUM Hit Parade, No. 12 in Flanders, and No. 21 in Wallonia.

Cover versions

In 1961, Dion DiMucci released his version of "Dream Lover" on the album Runaround Sue.

In 1971, Billy "Crash" Craddock released his version of "Dream Lover" as a single. Craddock's version reached No. 1 on Cash Boxs Country Top 65 chart and Record Worlds Country Singles Chart, while reaching No. 5 on Billboards Hot Country Singles chart. Craddock's version was included on his 1972 album You Better Move On.

In 1979, Ricky Nelson released a cover of "Dream Lover". His version reached No. 29 on Billboards Adult Contemporary chart and No. 59 on Billboards Hot Country Singles chart. 

Also, in 1979, Australian Glen Shorrock of Little River Band covered it. It was in the Australian Top 10 for 18 weeks, in 1979. See here

Country music singers Tanya Tucker and Glen Campbell released a duet of "Dream Lover" as a single on Tucker's 1980 album Dreamlovers.

In 2022, the actress and singer Evan Rachel Wood released her version with her band EVAN + ZANE included on their album "Dream".

References

1959 songs
1959 singles
1971 singles
1982 singles
Songs written by Bobby Darin
Bobby Darin songs
Peter McCann songs
Song recordings produced by Jerry Wexler
Song recordings produced by Ahmet Ertegun
Atco Records singles
Columbia Records singles
UK Singles Chart number-one singles
Billy "Crash" Craddock songs